Dialma Balsegia (born 11 March 1900; date of death unknown) was a Swiss skeleton racer who competed in the late 1940s. He finished 12th in the skeleton event at the 1948 Winter Olympics in St. Moritz.

References
Skeletonsport.com results

External links

1900 births
Year of death missing
Swiss male skeleton racers
Olympic skeleton racers of Switzerland
Skeleton racers at the 1948 Winter Olympics